Tweezers (Moochin) is an Iranian comedy-drama television series. The series is directed by Hossein Tabrizi.

Plot
Farzad and Sima are engaged to each other, but Sima's father has stipulated that Sima's older sister Mina must marry first. Farzin tells Farzad that I will sacrifice myself and propose to Mina...

Cast
Hamid Lolayi
Ali Sadeghi
Mehran Rajabi
Rabeh Oskouie
Marjaneh Golchin
Pouria Poursorkh
Behnoosh Bakhtiari
Afshin Sangchap
Reza Tavakoli
Zhale Dorostkar
Rose Razavi
Asha Mehrabi
Shohreh Lorestani
Amir Noori
Abbas Jamshidifar
Zahra Bahrami
Ramin Naser Nasir
Saed Hedayati
Mohammad Fili
Behrad Kharazi
Fatemeh Shokri
Hossein Tabrizi

References

External links

2020s Iranian television series
Iranian television series